Phaltan State was one of the non-salute Maratha princely states of British India. It was ruled by the Nimbalkar clan of the Marathas. It was under the central division of the Bombay Presidency, under the states of the Kolhapur-Deccan Residency, Satara Agency, and later the Deccan States Agency. Its capital was Phaltan town, located in present-day Maharashtra.

It had been one of the Satara Jagirs, which included Bhor, Aundh, Phaltan, Jath, Daphlapur and Akalkot. Its Flag was a rectangular bicolor, orange over green.

Geography
The state measured 397 square miles (1,028 km2) in area.  According to the 1901 census, the population showed a decrease of 31% in the decade at 45,739.  The population of the town itself was 9,512 in that year.

History
The Hindu ruling family was descended from Naik Nimbaji Nimbalkar (1284–1291), a Maratha who received a grant from a Delhi Sultanate emperor in the 14th century.  The ruler had the title of Raja, or Naik Nimbalkar.  The first wife, Sai Bai, of 17th century Maratha Emperor Shivaji, was from Phaltan.  Major HH Raja Bahadur Shrimant Malojirao Mudhojirao Nanasaheb Naik Nimbalkar IV was the last Ruler of Phaltan.

In 1901, the state enjoyed revenue estimated at £13,000- and paid a tribute to the British Raj of £640. On June 19, 1947, Udaysinha Naik Nimbalkar Rajkumar, Prince of Phaltan, and his mother the Maharani of Phaltan were passengers on Pan Am Flight 121, crewed by Gene Roddenberry, which crashed in Syria. Phaltan acceded to the Dominion of India on 8 March 1948 and is currently a part of Maharashtra state.

List of Rulers
Nimbraj I Nimbalkar, Naik 1284–1291
Padakhala Jagdevrao Dharpatrao Nimbalkar, Naik 1291–1327 
Nimbraj II Nimbalkar, Naik 1327–1349
Vanang Bhupal Nimbalkar, Naik 1349–1374
Vanangpal Nimbalkar, Naik 1390–1394
Vangoji I Nimbalkar, Naik 1394–1409
Maloji I Nimbalkar, Naik 1409–1420
Baji I Nimbalkar , Naik 1420–1445
Powwarao Nimbalkar, Naik 1445–1470
Baji II Nimbalkar, Naik 1470–1512
Mudhoji I Nimbalkar, Naik 1512–1527
Baji Dharrao Nimbalkar, Naik 1527–1560
Maloji II Nimbalkar, Naik 1560–1570
Vangoji II Jagpalrao Nimbalkar, Naik 1570–1630
Mudhoji II Nimbalkar, Naik 1630–1644
Bajaji Rao Naik Nimbalkar , Naik 1644–1676
Vangoji III Nimbalkar, Naik 1676–1693
Janoji Nimbalkar, Naik 1693–1748
Mudhojirao III Nimbalkar, Naik 1748–1765
Sayajirao Nimbalkar, Naik 1765–1774
Maloji III Rao Nimbalkar, Naik 1774–1777
Janojirao II Nimbalkar, Naik 1777–1827
Bajaji II Rao Nimbalkar, Naik 1827–1841
Mudhoji IV Rao Naik Nambalkar, Raja Shrimant, 1841–1916 (longest-reigning monarch in Phaltan)
Maloji IV Rao Mudhojirao Naik Nimbalkar, Raja Bahadur Shrimant 1916–1948, Head of the Royal family 1948–1978.
Pratapsinha Malojiraje Naik Nimbalkar Head of the Royal family 1978–2004.
Ramraje Pratapsinha Naik Nimbalkar Head of the Royal family 2004- till today....

See also
 Maratha
 Maratha Empire
 List of Maratha dynasties and states
 List of Indian princely states

References

Princely states of India
Satara district
States and territories disestablished in 1948